The men's 4 × 200 metre freestyle relay event at the 2020 Summer Olympics was held on 27 and 28 July 2021 at the Tokyo Aquatics Centre. It will be the event's twenty-sixth consecutive appearance, having been held at every edition since 1908.

Great Britain entered the final as favourites, boasting the gold and silver medalists from the individual 200 metres freestyle, Tom Dean and Duncan Scott, and 2015 World champion at the distance, James Guy. Despite Dean surprisingly giving up almost a second to the United States swimmer Kieran Smith on the opening leg, the British team's cumulative depth eventually told, as they duly delivered gold in the fastest ever time in a textile suit, just three hundredth's of a second outside the world record. It was the first British win in the event since 1908.

The medals for the competition were presented by David Haggerty, United States; IOC Member, and the medalists' bouquets were presented by Khaleel Al Jabir, Qatar; FINA Bureau Member.

Records
Prior to this competition, the existing world and Olympic records were as follows.

No new Olympic or World records were set during the competition.

Great Britain set a European record in the final, the third-fastest time ever (behind only the Olympic and World records) and the fastest time ever swum in a textile suit. Israel and Switzerland (twice) set national records.

Qualification

 
The top 12 teams in this event at the 2019 World Aquatics Championships qualified for the Olympics. An additional 4 teams will qualify through having the fastest times at approved qualifying events during the qualifying period (1 March 2019 to 30 May 2020).

Competition format

The competition consists of two rounds: heats and a final. The relay teams with the best 8 times in the heats advance to the final. Swim-offs are used as necessary to break ties for advancement to the next round.

Schedule
All times are Japan Standard Time (UTC+9)

Results

Heats
The relay teams with the top 8 times, regardless of heat, advanced to the final.

Final

References

Men's 4 x 200 metre freestyle relay
Olympics
Men's events at the 2020 Summer Olympics